Mocmex is a trojan, which was found in a digital photo frame in February 2008. It was the first serious computer virus on a digital photo frame. The virus was traced back to a group in China.

Overview 
Mocmex collects passwords for online games. The virus is able to recognize and block antivirus protection from more than a hundred security companies and the Windows built-in firewall. Mocmex downloads files from remote locations and hides randomly named files on infected computers. Therefore, the virus is difficult to remove. Furthermore, it spreads to other portable storage devices that were plugged into an infected computer. Industry experts describe the writers of the Trojan Horse as professionals and describe Mocmex as a "nuclear bomb of malware".

Protection 
As Mocmex can be described as a serious virus, protection is not hard. First of all, it is important to update your antivirus software, as updated antivirus works unless the malware writers get ahead of the antivirus vendors (which is what happened with the new Mocmex). Another way is to check a digital photo frame for malware on a Macintosh or Linux machine before plugging it into a computer with Windows, or disable autorun on Windows.

Effects 
A large part of digital photo frames were manufactured in China, particularly in Shenzhen. The negative publicity followed by media reports of the Chinese virus is expected to have negative effects on Chinese manufacturers. Mocmex happened just a few months after quality problems with toys manufactured in China raised the attention of Western countries leading to a low quality image for Chinese products.

References 

Digital photography
Display technology
Trojan horses
Hacking in the 2000s